Baxter is an extinct town in New Madrid County, in the U.S. state of Missouri. The GNIS classifies it as a populated place.

The community was named after one Mr. Baxter, the proprietor of a local lumber operation.

References

Ghost towns in Missouri
Former populated places in New Madrid County, Missouri